Nephrurus deleani, also known commonly as the acacia knob-tailed gecko, the Pernatty knob-tail, and the Pernatty knob-tailed gecko, is a species of lizard in the family Carphodactylidae. The species is endemic to Australia.

Etymology
The specific name, deleani, is in honor of Australian statistician Steven Delean, who collected the holotype.

Geographic range
N. deleani is found in the Australian state of South Australia.

Habitat
The preferred natural habitat of N. deleani is coastal sand dunes.

Reproduction
N. deleani is oviparous.

References

Further reading
Cogger HG (2014). Reptiles and Amphibians of Australia, Seventh Edition. Clayton, Victoria, Australia: CSIRO Publishing. xxx + 1,033 pp. . (Nephrurus deleani, p. 265).
Harvey C (1983). "A new species of Nephrurus (Reptilia: Gekkonidae) from South Australia". Transactions of the Royal Society of South Australia 107 (4): 231–235. (Nephrurus deleani, new species).
Rösler H (1995). Geckos der Welt – Alle Gattungen. Leipzig: Urania. 256 pp.  (Nephrurus deleani, 73). (in German).
Wilson S, Swan G (2013). A Complete Guide to Reptiles of Australia, Fourth Edition. Sydney: New Holland Publishers. 522 pp. .

Geckos of Australia
Nephrurus
Reptiles described in 1983
Taxa named by Chris Harvey (herpetologist)
Taxonomy articles created by Polbot
Reptiles of South Australia
Gawler bioregion